Ida is a 2013 drama film directed by Paweł Pawlikowski and written by Pawlikowski and Rebecca Lenkiewicz. Set in Poland in 1962, it follows a young woman on the verge of taking vows as a Catholic nun. Orphaned as an infant during the German occupation of World War II, she must meet her aunt, a former Communist state prosecutor and only surviving relative, who tells her that her parents were Jewish. The two women embark on a road trip into the Polish countryside to learn the fate of their relatives.

Called a "compact masterpiece" and an "eerily beautiful road movie", the film has also been said to "contain a cosmos of guilt, violence and pain", even if certain historical events (German occupation of Poland, the Holocaust and Stalinism) remain unsaid: "none of this is stated, but all of it is built, so to speak, into the atmosphere: the country feels dead, the population sparse".

Ida won the 2015 Academy Award for Best Foreign Language Film, becoming the first Polish film to do so. It had earlier been selected as Best Film of 2014 by the European Film Academy and as Best Film Not in the English Language of 2014 by the British Academy of Film and Television Arts (BAFTA). In 2016, the film was named as the 55th best film of the 21st century, from a poll of 177 film critics from around the world.

Plot
In the 1960s Polish People's Republic, Anna, a young novice nun, is told by her prioress that before she takes her final vows, she must visit her aunt, Wanda Gruz, who is her only surviving relative. Anna travels to Warsaw to visit her aunt Wanda, a chain-smoking, hard-drinking, sexually promiscuous judge who reveals that Anna's actual name is Ida Lebenstein; Ida's parents had been Jews who were murdered late in the German occupation of Poland during World War II (1939–45). Ida, after being orphaned, was raised by nuns in a convent. Wanda, who had been a Communist resistance fighter against the German occupation, became the state prosecutor "Red Wanda"  who sent "men to their deaths".

Wanda tells Ida that she should try worldly sins and pleasures before taking her vows. On their way to their hotel for the night, Wanda picks up a hitchhiker, Lis (Polish for "fox"), who turns out to be an alto saxophone player who is going to a gig in the same town. Wanda tries to get Ida interested in Lis and come to his show, but she resists until going down after hours to watch the band wrap up their evening with a song after the crowd has left. Lis is drawn to Ida and talks with her before she leaves for the night to rejoin her aunt, who is passed out in their room.

Ida wants to see her parents' graves, Róża and Haim Lebenstein, and Wanda reveals that it is unknown where or if they were buried. Wanda asks her what would happen if she goes to their bodies and discovers that God is not there. Wanda takes her to the house they were born in and used to own, now occupied by a Christian farmer, Feliks Skiba, and his family. During the war, the Skibas had taken over the home and land and hidden the Lebensteins from the German authorities. Wanda demands that Feliks tell her where his father is to tell her what happened to her family. After some searching, Wanda and Ida find him close to death in a hospital, where he remembers Róża and speaks well of the Lebensteins but says little else. Wanda reveals to Ida that she had left her son Tadzio with Róża and Haim while she went to fight in the Polish Resistance and that he presumably died alongside them, robbing her of the opportunity of getting to know him. Feliks does not want his father to die feeling guilty of murder and asks them to keep his father out of their search. Instead, he agrees to tell them where the bodies are buried if Ida promises to leave the Skibas alone and give up any claim to the house and land.

Feliks takes the women to the burial place in the woods and digs up the bones of their family. He admits to Ida that he took them into the woods and killed them. Feliks says that because Ida was very small and able to pass for a Christian, he gave her to a convent. But Wanda's small son was "dark and circumcised," and, as he couldn't pass for a Christian child, Feliks had killed him along with Ida's parents. Wanda and Ida take the bones to their family burial plot in an abandoned, overgrown Jewish cemetery in Lublin, and bury them.

Wanda and Ida then part ways and return to their previous existences and routines, but they both have been profoundly affected by their experience. Although Wanda continues to drink and engage in apparently meaningless casual sex, she is now mourning the loss of her niece along with her son and sister. Ida returns to the convent but is visibly thoughtful about her life and decides she is not yet ready to take her solemn vows. Wanda's melancholy deepens, and she ultimately jumps to her death out of her apartment window. Ida returns to Warsaw and attends Wanda's burial, where she sees Lis again. At Wanda's apartment, Ida changes out of her novitiate's habit and into Wanda's stilettos and evening gown, tries smoking and drinking, and then goes to Lis's gig, where he later teaches her to dance. They kiss.

After the show, Ida and Lis sleep together. Lis suggests they get married, have children, and after that, live "life as usual." The next morning, Ida quietly arises without awakening Lis, dons her novitiate habit again, and leaves, presumably to return to the convent and take her vows.

Cast
 Agata Kulesza as Wanda Gruz
 Agata Trzebuchowska as Anna / Ida Lebenstein
 Dawid Ogrodnik as Lis
 Adam Szyszkowski as Feliks Skiba
 Jerzy Trela as Szymon Skiba
 Joanna Kulig as a singer

Production

The director of Ida, Paweł Pawlikowski, was born in Poland and lived his first fourteen years there. In 1971 his mother abruptly emigrated with him to England, where he ultimately became a prominent filmmaker. Ida is his first Polish film; in an interview he said that the film "is an attempt to recover the Poland of my childhood, among many things". Ida was filmed in Poland with a cast and crew that was drawn primarily from the Polish film industry. The film received crucial early funding from the Polish Film Institute based on a screenplay by Pawlikowski and Rebecca Lenkiewicz, who is an English playwright. Once the support from the Polish Film Institute had been secured, producer Eric Abraham underwrote production of the film.

The first version of the screenplay was written in English by Lenkiewicz and Pawlikowski, when it had the working title Sister of Mercy. Pawlikowski then translated the screenplay into Polish and further adapted it for filming.

The character of Wanda Gruz is based on Helena Wolińska-Brus, although Wanda's life and fate differ significantly from the real-life model. Like the character, Wolińska-Brus was a Jewish Pole who survived World War II as a member of the Communist resistance. In the postwar Communist regime she was a military prosecutor who was involved in show trials.  One notorious example of these led to the 1953 execution of brigadier general Emil August Fieldorf, a famed resistance fighter in the Home Army. While Wolińska-Brus may have been involved, she was not the actual prosecutor for that trial. Pawlikowski met her in the 1980s in England, where she'd emigrated in 1971; he's said of her that "I couldn't square the warm, ironic woman I knew with the ruthless fanatic and Stalinist hangman.  This paradox has haunted me for years.  I even tried to write a film about her, but couldnʼt get my head around or into someone so contradictory."

Pawlikowski had difficulty in casting the role of Anna/Ida. After he'd interviewed more than 400 actresses, Agata Trzebuchowska was discovered by a friend of Pawlikowski's, who saw her sitting in a cafe in Warsaw reading a book. She had no acting experience or plans to pursue an acting career. She agreed to meet with Pawlikowski because she was a fan of his film My Summer of Love (2004).

Łukasz Żal and Ryszard Lenczewski are credited as the cinematographers. Lenczewski has been the cinematographer for Pawlikowski's feature films since Last Resort (2000); unlike Pawlikowski, Lenczewski had worked in Poland as well as England  prior to Ida. Ida is filmed in black and white, and uses the now uncommon 4:3 aspect ratio. When Pawlikowski told the film's producers of these decisions about filming, they reportedly commented, "Paul, you are no longer a student, don't be silly." Lenczewski has commented that, "We chose black and white and the 1.33 frame because it was evocative of Polish films of that era, the early 1960s. We designed the unusual compositions to make the audience feel uncertain, to watch in a different way." The original plan had been for Żal to assist Lenczewski. Lenczewski became ill, and Żal took over the project.

Production on Ida was interrupted mid-filming by an early snowstorm. Pawlikowski took advantage of the two-week hiatus to refine the script, find new locations, and rehearse. He credits the break for "making the film cohere ... in a certain, particular way."

Ida was edited by Jarosław Kamiński, a veteran of Polish cinema. Pawlikowski's previous English language feature films were edited by David Charap. Except the final scene of the film, there is no background musical score; as Dana Stevens explains, "the soundtrack contains no extradiegetic music—that is, music the characters aren't listening to themselves—but all the music that's there is significant and carefully chosen, from Wanda's treasured collection of classical LPs to the tinny Polish pop that plays on the car radio as the women drive toward their grim destination." As for the final scene, Pawlikowski has said, "The only piece of music that is non-ambient (from outside the world of the film – that is not on the radio or played by a band) is the piece of Bach at the end.  I was a bit desperate with the final scene, and I tried it out in the mix.  It's in a minor key, but it seems serene and to recognize the world and its complexities."

Critical reception
Ida received widespread acclaim, with critics praising its writing and cinematography. On Rotten Tomatoes, the film holds a 96% approval rating, based on 162 reviews, with an average rating of 8.36/10. The website's critical consensus reads, "Empathetically written, splendidly acted, and beautifully photographed, Ida finds director Pawel Pawlikowski revisiting his roots to powerful effect." On Metacritic, the film holds a score of 91 out of 100, based on 35 reviews, indicating "universal acclaim."

A. O. Scott of the New York Times writes that "with breathtaking concision and clarity—80 minutes of austere, carefully framed black and white—Mr. Pawlikowski penetrates the darkest, thorniest thickets of Polish history, reckoning with the crimes of Stalinism and the Holocaust." He concludes that "Mr. Pawlikowski has made one of the finest European films (and one of the most insightful films about Europe, past and present) in recent memory." David Denby of The New Yorker has called Ida a "compact masterpiece", and he discusses the film's reticence concerning the history in which it is embedded: "Between 1939 and 1945, Poland lost a fifth of its population, including three million Jews. In the two years after the war, Communists took over the government under the eyes of the Red Army and the Soviet secret police, the N.K.V.D.. Many Poles who were prominent in resisting the Nazis were accused of preposterous crimes; the independent-minded were shot or hanged. In the movie, none of this is stated, but all of it is built, so to speak, into the atmosphere ..." Denby considered Ida to be "by far the best movie of the year". Peter Debruge was more reserved about the film's success, writing in Variety that "...dialing things back as much as this film does risks losing the vast majority of viewers along the way, offering an intellectual exercise in lieu of an emotional experience to all but the most rarefied cineastes."

Ida is partially a "road movie" in which the relationship of its two main characters, Anna/Ida (Agata Trzebuchowska) and Wanda (Agata Kulesza), develops as they journey into Poland's hinterlands and into their shared history. Both actresses have received favorable reviews for their performances from several critics. Peter Bradshaw wrote in The Guardian that "Agata Trzebuchowska is tremendously mysterious as a 17-year-old novitiate in a remote convent: she has the impassivity and inscrutability of youth." Riva Reardon writes, "In her debut role, the actress masterfully negotiates the film's challenging subtlety, offering glimpses into her character with only a slight movement of the corner of her mouth or by simply shifting her uncanny black eyes." David Denby writes that "Wanda tells her of her past in brief fragments, and Kulesza does more with those fragments—adding a gesture, a pause—than anyone since Greta Garbo, who always implied much more than she said." Dana Stevens writes that "As played, stupendously, by the veteran Polish TV, stage, and film actress Agata Kulesza, Wanda is a vortex of a character, as fascinating to spend time with as she is bottomlessly sad."

Controversy and criticism
The film was criticized by Polish nationalists for its perspective on Christian–Jewish relations in Poland. A letter of complaint was sent by the right-wing Polish Anti-Defamation League to the Polish Film Institute, which provided significant funding for the film. A petition calling for the addition of explanatory title cards was signed by more than 40,000 Poles; the film does not explicitly note that thousands of Poles were executed by the German occupiers for hiding or helping Jewish Poles. Eric Abraham, one of the producers of Ida, responded: "Are they really suggesting that all films loosely based on historical events should come with contextual captions? Tell that to Mr. Stone and Mr. Spielberg and Mr. von Donnersmarck", referring to the directors of JFK, Lincoln, and The Lives of Others.

Conversely, others have argued that the character of Wanda Gruz, who participated in the persecution of those who threatened the Soviet-sponsored postwar regime, perpetuates a stereotype about Polish Jews as collaborators with the regime.

Influences
Several critics have discerned possible influences on Ida from Carl Theodor Dreyer's films and from Robert Bresson's. Thus David Thomson writes enthusiastically that seeing Ida is "like seeing Carl Dreyer's The Passion of Joan of Arc for the first time" and that the relationship of Ida and her aunt Wanda is "worthy of the Bresson of Diary of a Country Priest." The Passion of Joan of Arc (1928) is a silent film that is noted as one of the greatest films. M. Leary has expanded on the influence on Ida: "The actress that plays Ida was apparently noticed at a cafe and drafted in as a blank canvas for this character, who becomes a mute witness in the film to the terror of Jewish genocide and the Soviet aftermath. She is a bit like Dreyer's Joan in that her character is more about a violent march of history than her Catholic subtext." Dana Stevens writes that Ida is "set in the early 1960s, and its stylistic austerity and interest in theological questions often recall the work of Robert Bresson (though Pawlikowski lacks—I think—Bresson's deeply held faith in salvation)."

Other critics have emphasized stylistic similarities to New Wave films such as the definitive French film The 400 Blows (directed by François Truffaut-1959) and the Polish film Innocent Sorcerers (directed by Andrzej Wajda-1960). There are also similarities with Luis Buñuel's Viridiana (1961).

Box office
Grossing more than $3.8 million at the North American box office, the film has been described as a "crossover hit", especially for a foreign language film. Nearly 500,000 people watched the film in France, making it one of the most successful Polish-language films ever screened there. The film earned nearly as much in France, $3.2 million, as it did in the US. The film earned $300,000 in Poland, and less than $100,000 in Germany.

Accolades

Ida was screened in the Special Presentation section at the 2013 Toronto International Film Festival where it won the FIPRESCI Special Presentations award. Among other festivals Ida won Best Film at Gdynia, Warsaw, London, Bydgoszcz, Minsk, Gijón, Wiesbaden, Kraków. The film is also widely recognized for Agata Kulesza's and Agata Trzebuchowska's performances, and for the cinematography by Ryszard Lenczewski and Łukasz Żal.

The film was honoured by the national Polish Film Academy as the Best Film of 2013, winning in three other categories, and nominated in seven additional categories. The European Film Academy nominated the film in seven categories, winning 5, including Best European Film and People's Choice Award, at the 27th European Film Awards. The Spanish Academy of Arts and Cinematographic Sciences named Ida as Best European Film at the 29th Goya Awards. At the 68th British Academy Film Awards the film won the Award for Best Film Not in the English Language.

At the 87th Academy Awards, it won the award for Best Foreign Language Film, and was also nominated for Best Cinematography.

The film has received a nomination from Hollywood Foreign Press Association at the 72nd Golden Globe Awards for Best Foreign Language Film, and from International Press Academy at the 19th Satellite Awards for Best Foreign Language Film category.

It has been also recognised by the Swedish Film Institute (50th Guldbagge Awards), the Danish Film Academy (31st Robert Awards), the French Academy of Arts and Technics of Cinema (40th César Awards), the Catalan Academy of Cinema (7th Gaudí Awards). The film was also selected by the European Parliament for the Lux Prize.

Home media
Ida has been released to DVD in both region 1 and region 2 with English subtitles. It has also been released with subtitles in several other languages. In December 2014 the film was awarded the Lux Prize by the European Parliament; this prize supports subtitling of films into all of the 23 official languages of the European Union.

See also
 List of submissions to the 87th Academy Awards for Best Foreign Language Film
 List of Polish submissions for the Academy Award for Best Foreign Language Film
 Reverse (2009) (an earlier Polish film portraying Communist Poland in the 1950s and 1960s)
 Aftermath (2012) (a Polish thriller about reckoning with the destruction of a community of Polish Jews during World War II). Graham Fuller remarked, "Filmed in long shot, Anna and Wanda are dwarfed by the godless landscape, which inevitably evokes some of the woods and fields in Claude Lanzmann's Shoah and Władysław Pasikowski's Aftermath."

References

External links
  at Music Box Films
 
 
 
 

2013 films
2013 drama films
2010s drama road movies
BAFTA winners (films)
Best Foreign Language Film Academy Award winners
Best Foreign Language Film BAFTA Award winners
Best Film, London Film Festival winners
European Film Awards winners (films)
Films about the aftermath of the Holocaust
Films about Catholic nuns
Films about orphans
Films about suicide
Films directed by Paweł Pawlikowski
Films set in the 1960s
Films set in Poland
Films shot in Poland
Independent Spirit Award for Best Foreign Film winners
Polish black-and-white films
Polish drama films
2010s Polish-language films